Judith Woods is a Canadian judge on that country's Federal Court of Appeal.

History

Judith M. Woods was appointed to the Federal Court of Appeal on June 16, 2016.  She replaced Mr. Justice C. Michael Ryer, who resigned effective May 1, 2016. Madame Justice Woods was previously a judge of the Tax Court of Canada, where she served from 2003 to 2016.

References

Living people
Judges of the Federal Court of Appeal (Canada)
Canadian women judges
Judges of the Tax Court of Canada
Year of birth missing (living people)